Pucarajo (possibly from Quechua puka red, rahu snow, ice, mountain with snow, "red snow-covered mountain") is a mountain in the Andes of Peru, about  high. It is situated in the Ancash Region, Bolognesi Province, Huallanca District, and in the Huari Province, San Marcos District. Pucarajo lies northwest of the Yanashallash pass.

References

Mountains of Peru
Mountains of Ancash Region